Justice Thompson may refer to:

Smith Thompson (1768–1843), associate justice of the United States Supreme Court
Charles H. Thompson (Illinois judge) (1882–1972), chief justice of the Illinois Supreme Court
David N. Thompson (1859–1945), associate justice of the Louisiana Supreme Court
Ebenezer Thompson (1737–1802), associate justice of the New Hampshire Supreme Court
Floyd Thompson (lawyer) (1887–1960), associate justice of the Supreme Court of Illinois
Frank D. Thompson (1876–1940), associate justice of the Vermont Supreme Court
G. King Thompson (1887–1979), associate justice of the Vermont Supreme Court
Gordon R. Thompson (1918–1995), associate justice of the Supreme Court of Nevada
Hugh P. Thompson (born 1943), chief justice of the Georgia Supreme Court
Ira F. Thompson (1885–1937), associate justice of the Supreme Court of California
James Thompson (jurist) (1806–1874), associate justice of the Supreme Court of Pennsylvania
John C. Thompson (1790–1831), associate justice of the Vermont Supreme Court
John Thompson (Louisiana judge) (died 1810), judge of the Superior Court of the Territory of Orleans
Laforrest H. Thompson (1848–1900), associate justice of the Vermont Supreme Court
Leslie A. Thompson (1806–1874), associate justice of the Florida Supreme Court
Lucas P. Thompson (1797–1866), associate justice of the Supreme Court of Appeals of Virginia
William Carrington Thompson (1915–2011), associate justice of the Supreme Court of Appeals of Virginia
William George Thompson (1830–1911), associate justice of the Idaho Supreme Court
William Henry Thompson (1853–1937), associate justice of the Nebraska Supreme Court

See also
Judge Thompson (disambiguation)